Khishortob ( or Хширтоб Khshirtob, Yaghnobi Хишортоw) is a village in Sughd Region, northwestern Tajikistan. It is part of the jamoat Anzob in the Ayni District, and located north east of the village Anzob. The population of village was 48 in 2007.

References
 Сайфиддин Мирзозода: Фарҳанги яғнобӣ-тоҷикӣ. Душанбе (Анҷумани Деваштич) 2008.

Populated places in Sughd Region
Yaghnob